Effron is a surname. Notable people with the surname include: 

Andrew S. Effron (born 1948), former Chief Judge 
Blair Effron (born 1962), American financier
David Effron (born 1938), American conductor and educator
José Effron (born 1986), Argentine Paralympic judoka

See also
Efron